Alfredo José Espinoza Mateus S.D.B. (born 22 April 1958) is an Ecuadorean prelate of the Catholic Church who was named Archbishop of Quito on 5 April 2019.

Biography
Alfredo José Espinoza Mateus was born on 22 April 1958 in Guayaquil, Ecuador. He took his first vows as a Salesian on 24 January 1979 and his final vows on 16 August 1984. 
He was ordained a priest on 17 December 1988. He earned a licentiate in education sciences from the Pontifical University of Ecuador.

Between 1983 and 2013,  Espinoza held a series of positions in Salesian educational institutions as administrator, vice-rector and rector, and within the Salesian order, including financial director of the Salesians of Ecuador from 2009 to 2013. He was a member of the board of directors and the economic council of the Politecnica Salesiana University and, from 2011 to 2013, head of the order's oversight board and a member of its committee for vocations.

Pope Francis named him Bishop of Loja on 20 December 2013, and he received his episcopal consecration from Archbishop Giacomo Guido Ottonello on 18 January 2014.

Pope Francis appointed him Archbishop of Quito of 5 April 2019. He was installed there on 2 May.

References

Additional sources

External links
 Archdiocese of Quito

1958 births
Living people
21st-century Roman Catholic archbishops in Ecuador
People from Guayaquil
Salesian bishops
Roman Catholic bishops of Loja
Roman Catholic archbishops of Quito